Italy finished clear winners of this group with seven points. Injury-time equalisers for Austria, first against Cameroon and then against Chile, meant that all three of these teams could still qualify with one match to go. Austria were then eliminated after losing their final game to Italy (despite scoring once again in injury-time). Chile conceded equalisers in all their games, but their three draws were enough for them to qualify in second place and advance with a record-low three points.

Standings

Italy advanced to play Norway (runner-up of Group A) in the round of 16.
Chile advanced to play Brazil (winner of Group A) in the round of 16.

Matches

Italy vs Chile

Cameroon vs Austria

Chile vs Austria

Italy vs Cameroon

Italy vs Austria

Chile vs Cameroon

Group B
Group
Austria at the 1998 FIFA World Cup
Chile at the 1998 FIFA World Cup
Cameroon at the 1998 FIFA World Cup